Gučevo is a mountain in western Serbia, near the town of Loznica, overlooking the Drina river and Banja Koviljača. Its highest peak Crni vrh has an elevation of 779 meters above sea level.

The mountain was a site of Battle of Gučevo between Serbian and Austro-Hungarian army in World War I. At the top of the mountain there is a monument to Serbian and Austro-Hungarian soldiers.

References

External links
Biking tour over Gučevo

Mountains of Serbia